Prisco is both a given name and surname. Notable people with the name include:

Pietro Prisco Guglielmucci (died 1539), Italian Roman Catholic Bishop of Lavello (1515–1539)
Giuseppe Antonio Ermenegildo Prisco (1833-1923), Italian Roman Catholic Church Cardinal and Archbishop of Naples
Prisco Nilo (born 1957), Filipino meteorologist
Albert Prisco (1890–?), American actor
Angelo Prisco (born 1939), American mobster
Giulio Prisco (born 1957), Italian physicist
Giuseppe Antonio Ermenegildo Prisco (1833–1923), Italian cardinal
Lorenzo Prisco (born 1987), Italian footballer
Michele Prisco (1920–2003), Italian journalist
Nick Prisco (1909–1981), American football player
Teodoro "Prisco" Alcalde Millos (1913–1995), Peruvian footballer

See also
 Prisco (disambiguation)